Eungella may refer to:

Places
 Eungella, Queensland, a rural town and locality in the Mackay Region, Australia
 Eungella National Park, a protected area in the Mackay Region, Queensland, Australia
 Eungella Dam, a dam in Queensland, Australia
 Eungella, New South Wales, a town in New South Wales, Australia

Animals
 Eungella honeyeater
 Eungella torrent frog
 Eungella tinker frog
 Eungella gastric brooding frog